Bennett is an English, Irish, and Scottish surname and, less commonly, a given name.  Alternative spellings include Bennet, Benett and Benet.

It is related also to the medieval name Benedict from the Latin "Benedictus" meaning "well-spoken of" or "blessed". Bennett is the English spelling of the Anglo-Norman name Ben[n]et (modern French first name Benoît, surname Bénet). The oldest public record of the surname is dated 1208 in County Durham in North East England. 

In Ireland, the name is an Irish rendition of Mac Beinéid , which is located in South Leinster. The name is also found throughout the southeastern providence of Ulster in Northern Ireland in the form of "MacBennett" in County Monaghan, County Down, and County Tyrone.

Bennett was also found in Perthshire in Scotland. According to author George F. Black, Benedictus, the son of Walter de Sancto Edmundo, witnessed a charter of sale of land in Perth in 1219.

People

Given name 
People with the given name include:
Benny Carter (1907–2003), jazz saxophonist, arranger, and composer
Bennett Cerf (1898–1971), publisher and founder of American publishing firm Random House
Ben Cohen (businessman) (born 1951), American businessman and cofounder of Ben & Jerry's
Bennett Foddy (born 1978), game designer and philosopher
Bennett Jackson (born 1991), American football player
Bennett Malone (1944–2017), American politician
Bennett Miller (born 1966), American film director 
Bennet Omalu (born 1968), Nigerian-American pathologist 
Bennett Joseph Savage (born 1980), American actor

Surname 
People with the surname include:
Abram Bennett (1898–1985), American psychiatrist
Adam Bennett (born 1971), Canadian ice hockey player and coach
Adam Bennett Schiff (born 1960), American politician 
Adelaide George Bennett (1848–1911), American poet and botanist
Alan Bennett (disambiguation), multiple people
Alex Bennett (disambiguation), multiple people
Alf Bennett (1898–?), English footballer with Nottingham Forest and Port Vale
Alfred Bennett (disambiguation), multiple people
A. L. Bennett Ambrose L. Bennett (1924–2008), American basketball player
Amelia Bennett (1839–1921) aka Amelia Horne, Amy Haines, British memoir writer
April Steiner Bennett (born 1980), American pole vaulter
Arnold Bennett (1867–1931), English novelist
Anthony Bennett (disambiguation), multiple people and Tony Bennett, several people
Barry Bennett (1955–2019), American football player
Beck Bennett (born 1984), American comedian and actor
Belva Ann Bennett (1830–1917), American attorney, politician, educator, and author
Bert Bennett (1889/1890–1968), English footballer
Beverly Lynn Bennett (born 1967), American chef
Bob Bennett (baseball) (1933–2020), American college baseball coach
Bob Bennett (politician) (1933–2016), U.S. Senator (R-Utah) 
Bobby Bennett (disambiguation), multiple people
Brian Bennett (born 1940), English musician and drummer 
Brooke Bennett (born 1980), American swimmer
Bryan Bennett (born 1992), American football quarterback
Bruce Bennett (born Harold Herman Brix; 1906–2007), American actor and Olympian
Carl Bennett (1915–2013), American basketball manager and coach
Carol Bennett (born 1954), American painter and glass artist
Carolyn Bennett, PC MP (born 1950), Canadian physician and politician
Carolyn Bennett (comedian) (born 1962), Canadian comedian
Chance the Rapper (Chancellor Jonathan Bennett), American rapper
Charles Bennett (disambiguation), multiple people
Chris Bennett (disambiguation), multiple people
Chloe Bennet (born 1992), American singer and actress
Christiana Bennett, American ballet dancer
Chuck Bennett (1907–1973), American football player and coach
Claire-Louise Bennett (fl. 2015), Irish writer
Clarence Edmund Bennett (1803–1932), American Army officer 
Clay Bennett (businessman) (born 1959), American businessman
Clay Bennett (cartoonist) (born 1958), American editorial cartoonist
Cole Bennett (born 1996), American videographer and business executive
Colin Bennett (disambiguation), multiple people
Constance Bennett (1904–1965), American actress
Cornelius Bennett (born 1965), American football player
Crystal Bennett (1918–1987), British archaeologist
D. M. Bennett (1818–1882), American Shaker and freethinker
Darren Bennett (footballer) (born 1965), Australian football player
David Bennett (disambiguation), multiple people, several people, including
David Bennett (American football) (born 1961), American football coach
David Bennett (New Zealand politician) (born 1970), New Zealand politician
David Bennett Hill (1843–1910), American politician; Governor of New York State 
David Bennett McKinley (born 1947), American businessman and politician 
Dayvon Bennett (1994–2020), American rapper known as King Von
DeAnna Bennett (born 1984), American mixed martial artist
Deborah J. Bennett (born 1950), American mathematician
Dick Bennett (born 1943), American basketball coach
Don Bennett (1910–1986), leader of the Pathfinder force, RAF, World War II
Don Bennett (disambiguation), multiple people, several other people, including
Donald W. Bennett (born 1927), Major General in the United States Air Force
Drew Bennett (born 1978), American football player
Dwight Henry Bennett (1917–2002), American aeronautical engineer
Edgar Bennett (born 1969), American football coach and running back
Edwin Keppel Bennett (1887–1958), English academic
Edward Bennett (disambiguation), multiple people, several people including
Edward Herbert Bennett (1874–1954), American architect and Chicago city planner
Edward Turner Bennett (1797–1836), English zoologist
Elmer Bennett (born 1970), American professional basketball player
Emerson Bennett (1822–1905), American author
Eric Bennett (disambiguation), multiple people
Estelle Bennett (1941–2009), American singer (The Ronettes)
Fleur Bennett, English actress
Forrest Bennett, American politician
Fran Bennett (1937–2021), American actress
Frank Bennett (disambiguation), multiple people
Fred Bennett (footballer) (1906–1990), English footballer
Gabriel Bennett (1817–1895), Australian auctioneer of Bennett & Fisher
Gareth Bennett (disambiguation), multiple people
Gary Bennett (disambiguation), multiple people
George Bennett (disambiguation), multiple people
Gloria Bennett (born 1962), American singer, songwriter, record producer and musician
Gordon Bennett (disambiguation), multiple people
Granville G. Bennett (1833–1910), American lawyer and politician
H. H. Bennett (Henry Hamilton Bennett, 1843–1908), photographer of the Wisconsin Dells
Haley Bennett (born 1988), American singer and actress
Hamish Bennett, New Zealand cricketer
Hamish Bennett (director), New Zealand filmmaker
Harry Bennett (1892–1979), Ford Motor Company executive
Harry Bennett (1895–1990), author/editor of "The Chemical Formulary"
Harve Bennett (1930–2015), American television and film producer
Henry Bennett (American politician) (1808–1868), US Representative from New York)
Lt. Henry Boswell Bennett (1809–1838), the first officer to die in the service of Queen Victoria
Henry Stanley Bennett (1889–1972), English literary historian
Herman Bennett (born 1939), Jamaican cricketer
Herman Bennett (scholar), American scholar
Hugh Hammond Bennett (1881–1960), founder of the Soil Conservation Service
Hywel Bennett (1944–2017), Welsh actor
Jakorian Bennett (born 2000), American football player
J. A. W. Bennett (1911–1981), New Zealand scholar of Middle English literature
James Bennett (disambiguation), multiple people, also Jim Bennett
Jimmy Bennett (born 1996), American actor and musician
Jeff Bennett (born 1962), American voice actor
Jeff Bennett (disambiguation), multiple people other persons of that name
Jill Bennett (American actress) (born 1975)
Jill Bennett (British actress) (1931–1990)
Joan Bennett (1910–1990),  American stage, film and television actress
Joe Bennett (artist) (born 1968), Brazilian comic book artist
John Bennett (disambiguation), multiple people
John J. Bennett Jr. (1894–1967), American lawyer and politician
John Joseph Bennett (1801–1876), British botanist
John Orus Bennett III (born 1948), American politician from New Jersey 
Jonathan Bennett (disambiguation), multiple people
Joseph Bennett (disambiguation), multiple people
Josephine Bennett (1880–1961), American suffragist and activist
Josie Bennett (1903–1985), American rodeo professional
Justin Bennett (born 1973), drummer and producer
Karen Bennett (born 1989), British rower
Keith Bennett (disambiguation), multiple people, several people:
Ken Bennett (born 1959), American politician
Kyle Bennett (footballer) (born 1990), English football midfielder
Laura Bennett (born 1963), American architect and fashion designer
Lauren Bennett (born 1989), English female singer, dancer, and model
Lawrence E. Bennett (1923–2016), American politician
Lee Ann Bennett, US air force general
Lennie Bennett (1938–2009), English comedian and game show host
Leo Bennett (1914–1971), British first-class cricketer
Lerone Bennett Jr. (1928–2018), American journalist and writer
Les Bennett (1918–1999) Footballer for Tottenham Hotspur and West Ham United
Lilian Bennett (1922–2013), British businesswoman
Linda L. M. Bennett (born 1952), American administrator and political scientist
Liz Bennett, American politician; first openly LGBT woman in the Iowa House of Representatives
Lorna Bennett (born 1977), Jamaican reggae singer 
Louis Bennett (disambiguation), multiple people
Louise Bennett-Coverley (1919–2006), Jamaican poet, folklorist, writer, and educator
Lyman Bennett (1801–1877), garment manufacturer
Lynda Bennett (born 1954), New Zealand lawn bowler
Manu Bennett (born 1969), Australian actor
Maria Kanellis-Bennett (Mary Louis Kanellis-Bennett, born 1982), American wrestler
Mark Bennett (disambiguation), multiple people
Mark J. Bennett (born 1953), Judge of the United States Court of Appeals
Marshall Bennett (1915–2018), American real estate developer
Martellus Demond Bennett (born 1987), American football tight end and children's author
Martyn Bennett (1971–2005), Canadian-Scottish musician 
Matt Bennett (born 1991), American actor
Matthew Bennett (disambiguation), multiple people
Max Bennett (actor) (born 1984), English actor
Max Bennett (ice hockey) (1912–1972), ice hockey player
Max Bennett (musician) (1928–2018), American jazz bassist and session musician
Max Bennett (scientist) (born 1939), Australian neuroscientist
Michael Bennett (disambiguation), multiple people, several people, including
Michael Bennett (defensive lineman, born 1985) (born 1985), American football defensive 
Michael Bennett (running back) (born 1978), American footballer
Michael Bennett (theater) (1943–1987), American musical theatre
Michèle Bennett (born 1950), wife of former Haitian president Jean-Claude Duvalier
Mike Bennett (wrestler) (born 1985), American professional wrestler
Milton Bennett, American sociologist
Naftali Bennett (born 1972), Israeli politician; 13th Prime Minister of Israel
Natalie Bennett (born 1966), politician, Leader of the Green Party of England & Wales
Nathan Bennett (born 1984), Australian Rugby League player
Nicholas Bennett (disambiguation), multiple people
Nigel Bennett (born 1949), English actor
Nigel Harvie Bennett (1913–2008), English cricketer
Owen Bennett (born 1985), British journalist
Paul Bennett (disambiguation), multiple people
Paul Stuart-Bennett, British lightweight rower
Paula Bennett (born 1969), New Zealand politician 
Paris Bennett (born 1988), American singer
Pauline Bennett (born 1964), British DJ, dance teacher, and rapper
Peggy Bennett (born 1958), American politician from Minnesota
Percy Bennett (1869–1936), Wales rugby union player
Pete Bennett (born 1982), winner of series 7 of Big Brother UK
Phillip R. Bennett (born 1948), CEO of Refco
R. B. Bennett (Richard Bedford Bennett, 1st Viscount Bennett, 1870–1947), Prime Minister of Canada
Rainey Bennett (1907–1998), American artist and illustrator
Ralph Bennett (1923–2015), English transport administrator
Rayshawn Bennett (born 1991), American rapper and singer known professionally as YFN Lucci
Richard Bennett (governor) (1608–1675), British colonial governor of Virginia
Richard Bennett (guitarist) (born 1951), American guitarist and record producer
Richard A. Bennett (born 1963), American politician 
Richard Rodney Bennett (1936–2012), English composer
Robert Russell Bennett (1894–1981), American composer
Rodney D. Bennett (born 1966), American university president
Roger Bennett (disambiguation), multiple people
Roy Bennett (disambiguation), multiple people
Ruth L. Bennett (1866–1947), American social reformer
Ryan Bennett (footballer) (born 1990), English footballer 
Sam Bennett (disambiguation), multiple people
Samm Bennett, American musician
Sacha Bennett (born 1971), English film director, writer, producer
Sandy Bennett (Sandra Kaye Bennett born 1972), aka Sandy Hitchcock, New Zealand hockey player 
Sara Bennett, British visual effects artist
Scott Bennett (disambiguation)
Sonja Bennett, Canadian actress, screenwriter
Stella Bennett, New Zealand singer-songwriter
Stetson Bennett (born 1998), American football player
Stu Bennett (born 1980), English wrestler, known as Wade Barrett
Susan Bennett (born 1949), American voice artist; voice of Apple's "Siri"
Syd Bennett (born 1992), American singer-songwriter, record producer 
Taylor Bennett (rapper) (born 1996), American rapper
Ted Bennett (born 1940), American politician
Thomas Bennett Jr. (1781–1865), Governor of South Carolina
Thomas Jewell Bennett (1852–1925) British politician and journalist with The Times of India
Thomas M. Bennett (born 1956), American politician (Illinois House of Representatives)
Thomas Westropp Bennett (1867–1962), Irish politician, magistrate and public figure
Todd Bennett (1962–2013), English sprinter
Tony Bennett (born 1926), American vocalist
Tony Bennett (American football) (born 1967), American professional football linebacker
Tony Bennett (basketball) (born 1969), American basketball player and coach
Tracie Bennett (born 1961), English stage and television actress
Veronica Yvette Bennett (1943–2022), American singer
Vincent Bennett (born 1982), singer of The Acacia Strain
W. A. C. Bennett (William Andrew Cecil Bennett 1900–1979), Premier of British Columbia
Wayne Bennett (disambiguation), multiple people
Wilda Bennett (1894–1967), American actress
William Bennett (disambiguation), multiple people
 William Bennett (born 1943), American conservative pundit and politician
Bill Bennett (William Richards Bennett 1932–2015), premier of British Columbia
William Bennett Campbell, PC (1943–2008), premier of Prince Edward Island, Canada 
William Sterndale Bennett (1816–1875), English composer, pianist, conductor, and music educator

Fictional characters 
 Agent James Bennett, a character in the DC Animated Universe
 Annie Bennett-Warbucks, protagonist and title character from the Annie musical and film adaptations
 Bonnie Sheila Bennett (of the family line of Bennett witches), a character in The Vampire Diaries
 Capt. Bennett, a character in the 1985 film Commando
 Cybil Bennett, a character in the Silent Hill series
Dexter Bennett, a character of the fictional New York City tabloid newspaper Daily Bugle
 Emily Bennett, a character in The Vampire Diaries
 Emily Bennett, a character in the American Girl series of dolls and books
 John Bennett, a character in Orange Is the New Black
 Sheila Bennett, a character in The Vampire Diaries
 Shirley Bennett, a character in Community
 The Bennet family, a family of characters in Pride and Prejudice
 Bennett, a character in Genshin Impact
 Rue Bennett, a character in Euphoria

References 

English-language surnames
Surnames of Norman origin
Surnames from given names